Lake Avram Iancu-Ocnița is a natural salt lake in the town of Ocna Sibiului, Sibiu County, Transylvania, Romania. It is one of the many lakes of the Ocna Sibiului mine, a large salt mine which has one of the largest salt reserves in Romania. The lake is the result of the lakes Avram Iancu and Ocnița merging into a single lake.

Name 
The old Avram Iancu Lake is named after Avram Iancu, a Transylvanian Romanian lawyer who played an important role in the local chapter of the Austrian Empire Revolutions of 1848–1849. The lake was also called Ocna Pustie (meaning the bare mine)

The name of the other lake, Ocnița, means small mine, after the Romanian word ocnă, meaning (salt) mine. It was named so because of the salt mine that created it, which was smaller than the mine of its neighbor lake, Avram Iancu.

History 
Lake Avram Iancu (Ocna Pustie) was formed on the "Fodina Maior" ("Grosse Grube") saline, exploited in a bell system through two wells up to a depth of 160 m.

Lake Ocnița was formed on the basis of the "Fodina Minor" ("Kleine Grube"), exploited in a bell system up to a depth of 136 m, through two wells, and abandoned in 1817 due to water infiltration.

Information 
Surface:  (combined surface of the two old lakes)
Maximum depth: 
Salinity: 170-260 g/l
Fauna: Artemia salina

Lakes of the salt mine 
 Auster 
 Lake Avram Iancu-Ocniţa
 Balta cu Nămol 
 Brâncoveanu 
 Cloşca 
 Crişan
 Lacul Fără Fund 
 Gura Minei 
 Horea 
 Mâţelor 
 Negru
 Pânzelor 
 Rândunica 
 Verde (Freshwater lake)
 Vrăjitoarelor (Freshwater lake)

References

Lakes of Sibiu County